The London and North Western Railway (LNWR) Webb Coal Tank is a class of 0-6-2T steam locomotive.  They were called "Coal Tanks" because they were a side tank version of Webb's standard LNWR 17in Coal Engine, an 0-6-0 tender engine for slow freight trains.

Design
The design was introduced in 1881 by F.W. Webb and had the same cheaply produced cast iron wheels and H-section spokes as the tender engines. A trailing radial axle supporting the bunker was added also with two similarly cast iron wheels.  Three hundred were built between 1881 and 1897.

Operational history
Four (LNWR nos. 178, 484, 1257, 69) were withdrawn in January–February 1920 and a further four (LNWR nos. 142, 994, 782, 1012) in July and November 1922, so at the 1923 grouping, 292 passed to the London Midland and Scottish Railway (LMS). They were renumbered from the LNWR's random allocation based on vacant numbers, to a solid block sequence 7550–7841, and given the power classification 1F. Many locomotives still in service in 1934 were renumbered by the addition of 20,000 to their number.

Preservation 

 
One Coal Tank number BR 58926, ex-LMS 7799, originally LNWR 1054, the 250th one built, has survived in preservation on the Keighley and Worth Valley Railway, normally carrying its LNWR livery and number. The locomotive is owned by the National Trust and is maintained and run by the Bahamas Locomotive Society.

Models

Bachmann Branchline released a model of the coal tanks in 2017. The three variants released were:
-LNWR Black 1054 (As preserved)
-LMS Black 7841
-BR Black early emblem 58900
So far, these are the only variants in production with no other liveries announced.

Notes

References

External links 

 Goods Engines of LNWR

0-6-2T locomotives
Webb Coal Tank
Railway locomotives introduced in 1881
Standard gauge steam locomotives of Great Britain
C1′ n2t locomotives
Freight locomotives